The women's tournament in ice hockey at the 2018 Winter Olympics was held in Gangneung, South Korea between 10 and 22 February 2018. Eight countries qualified for the tournament; five of them did so automatically by virtue of their ranking by the International Ice Hockey Federation, one, South Korea, automatically qualified as hosts, while the two others took part in a qualification tournament. Under a special agreement with the IOC and the IIHF, twelve North Korean players joined the host team to form a united team. They were allowed to have an expanded roster of 35 where 22 players dress for each game. Three North Korean players were selected for each game by coach Sarah Murray.

The United States winning the gold medal game against Canada marks the first time in 20 years that the United States took home a gold medal in women's hockey. They previously won in 1998 in Nagano, Japan, which was also against Canada. Canada's loss ended their winning streak of four consecutive winter games, having won since 2002.

Qualification

Canada and the United States assured themselves of top four ranking after the 2016 Women's Ice Hockey World Championships by the end of the 2015 Championships and qualified for the A group.

Finland, Russia, and Sweden qualified by their ranking after the 2016 Championships.

South Korea qualified as the host team. The remaining two teams qualified from qualification tournaments.

Qualified teams

Notes

Format
The top four teams based on the 2016 IIHF World Ranking, the United States, Canada, Finland and Olympic Athletes from Russia, compete in Group A, while the remaining four teams compete in Group B. The top two teams in Group A received a bye to the semifinals. In the quarterfinals, the third placed team in Group A played the second place team in Group B, while the fourth placed team in Group A played the first place team in Group B. The winners advanced to the semifinals, while the two losers, and the third and fourth placed teams in Group B, competed in a classification bracket for places five through eight.

Rosters

Match officials
10 referees and 9 linesmen were selected for the tournament.

Referees
 Gabrielle Ariano-Lortie
 Nicole Hertrich
 Aina Hove
 Drahomira Fialova
 Nikoleta Celárová
 Gabriella Gran
 Katarina Timglas
 Dina Allen
 Katie Guay
 Melissa Szkola

Linesmen
 Justine Todd
 Zuzana Svobodová
 Jenni Heikkinen
 Johanna Tauriainen
 Charlotte Girard-Fabre
 Lisa Linnek
 Nataša Pagon
 Veronica Johansson
 Jessica Leclerc

Preliminary round
All times are local (UTC+9).

Group A

Group B

Playoff round

Bracket

Fifth place bracket

Quarterfinals
The top two teams in Group A received byes and were deemed the home team in the semifinals as they were seeded to advance.

5–8th place semifinals

Semifinals

Seventh place game

Fifth place game

Bronze medal game

Gold medal game

Medalists

Final ranking

Statistics

Scoring leaders
List shows the top ten skaters sorted by points, then goals.

GP = Games played; G = Goals; A = Assists; Pts = Points; +/− = Plus/minus; PIM = Penalties in minutes; POS = Position
Source: IIHF.com

Leading goaltenders
Only the top five goaltenders, based on save percentage, who have played at least 40% of their team's minutes, are included in this list.

TOI = Time on ice (minutes:seconds); SA = Shots against; GA = Goals against; GAA = Goals against average; Sv% = Save percentage; SO = Shutouts
Source: IIHF.com

Awards
Media All-Stars
Goaltender:  Noora Räty
Defencemen:  Jenni Hiirikoski,  Laura Fortino
Forwards:  Mélodie Daoust,  Jocelyne Lamoureux,  Alina Müller
Most Valuable Player:  Mélodie Daoust
Best players selected by the directorate:
Best Goaltender:  Shannon Szabados
Best Defenceman:  Jenni Hiirikoski
Best Forward:  Alina Müller
Source: IIHF.com

References

External links
Official IIHF website

 
Women's tournament
Women's ice hockey in South Korea
Olymp
Women's events at the 2018 Winter Olympics